The following lists events that happened during 1986 in the Grand Duchy of Luxembourg.

Incumbents

Events

January – March
 17 February – The Single European Act is signed in The Hague.

April – June
 3 May – Representing Luxembourg, Sherisse Laurence finishes third in the Eurovision Song Contest 1986 with the song L'amour De Ma Vie.
 8 May – The Karlspreis is awarded to the people of Luxembourg for Luxembourg's commitment to European integration.  Grand Duke Jean collects it on the people's behalf.
 9–12 June – Grand Duke Jean and Grand Duchess Josephine-Charlotte make a state visit to Iceland.

July – September
 26 September – Prince Jean renounces the right of succession for himself and his descendants.

October – December

Births
 3 August – Prince Louis of Luxembourg
 8 December – Princess Marie-Gabrielle of Nassau

Deaths

Footnotes

References